Exeter Mosque & Cultural Centre is a mosque in the City of Exeter, in Devon, England.

History 
The mosque's history began in 1976 when 15 York Road was purchased for use as a permanent place for meeting and prayer. Over time, as more space was needed 14 York Road was also purchased. Following a purchase of land from the adjacent school in the late 2000s, work began on a purpose-built mosque for Exeter's Muslim community. The current mosque opened in 2011 following three years of construction work, which cost approximately £1.7 million.

In 2018, the trustees of the mosque faced questions from the media regarding donations received from the cleric Sadiq Al-Ghariani.

Following the 2019 Christchurch mosque shootings, Exeter Mosque was one of the mosques where people stood guard in solidarity with the Muslim community.

References 

Mosques in England
Buildings and structures in Exeter
1976 establishments in England
Mosques completed in 2011